Canadian Journal of Fisheries and Aquatic Sciences is a peer-reviewed academic journal which focuses on multidisciplinary field of aquatic sciences. It was founded in 1901 by the Biological Board of Canada, later known as the Fisheries Research Board of Canada.

It is published monthly by Canadian Science Publishing.

Publishing history
founded 1901, as Contributions to Canadian Biology and Fisheries
name changed to Journal of the Biological Board of Canada
name changed to Journal of the Fisheries Research Board of Canada
name changed to Canadian Journal of Fisheries and Aquatic Sciences

Abstracting and indexing
The journal is indexed in  Science Citation Index Expanded, Scopus, Academic Search Premier, PASCAL, Animal Behavior Abstracts, Aqualine, Aquatic Science & Fisheries Abstracts (ASFA), Artic & Antarctic Regions, BIOSIS, CAB Abstracts, Environment Index, Pollution Abstracts, Veterinary Science Database, Geobase.

References

External links

Zoology journals
Canadian Science Publishing academic journals
Ichthyology journals